Alexander Nelson Hood, 4th Viscount Bridport, 7th Duke of Bronte (born 17 March 1948), known as Alex Bridport, is a British investment banker, resident in Geneva, Switzerland.

Early life
He is the only son and heir of Rowland Hood, 3rd Viscount Bridport, 6th Duke of Bronte (1911–1969), of Castello di Maniace near Bronte in Sicily (a descendant of William Nelson, 1st Earl Nelson, 2nd Duke of Bronte, elder brother and heir of Admiral Horatio Nelson, 1st Viscount Nelson, 1st Duke of Bronte), by his second wife Sheila Jeanne Agatha van Meurs, only daughter of Johan Hendrik van Meurs and widow of Wing-Commander J.H. Little, DFC, Auxiliary Air Force.

Career
He grew up in the Castello di Maniace, Sicily, and was educated at Eton College and the Sorbonne. He joined Kleinwort Benson merchant bank in London, before going on to Chase Manhattan Bank which sent him to Geneva in 1985 to be General Manager of Investment Banking. He was appointed Managing Director of Shearson Lehman Brothers, New York, in 1988. In 1991 he set up Bridport & Cie S.A. in Geneva, Switzerland, with Thomas Bartholdi, and both remain managing partners, together with Count Luca Padulli. In 1981, facing an on-going turbulent political situation in Italy and the prospect of further demands for land reform from an historically inimical faction of the local population, he sold his paternal estate of the Duchy of Bronte and his seat within it, the Castello di Maniace, granted to Admiral Nelson in 1799 by the King of the Two Sicilies.

Marriages and issue
He married twice:

Firstly, on 5 January 1972, to Linda Jacqueline Paravicini, a daughter of Lt-Col Vincent Rudolph Paravicini, TD, of Nutley Manor near Basingstoke, Hampshire (a son of Charles Paravicini, the Swiss Ambassador to the Court of St. James's), by his wife Jacqueline Dyer, a sister of Sir John Dyer, 13th Baronet. 
She obtained a divorce in 1979 and in 1983 remarried to Michael Howard, 21st Earl of Suffolk (born 1935) of Charlton Park, near Malmesbury, Wiltshire. By his first wife he had issue:
Hon. Peregrine Alexander Nelson Hood (b. 1974), eldest son and heir apparent, who on 8 June 2013 at St John the Baptist, Charlton, Malmesbury (his step-father's parish church), married Serena Nikkhah (b. 1983), an Iranian-American and Executive Fashion Editor at British Vogue magazine. Guests included Princess Michael of Kent, Tom Parker Bowles and Pippa Middleton.
Secondly, on 5 December 1979, he married Nina Lincoln (widow of Formula 1 racing driver Jochen Rindt) from whom he was divorced in 1999, having had a further son:
Hon. Anthony Nelson Hood (b. 1983).

Notes

Further reading
Biography in euromoney.com, Viscount Bridport, Chairman, Bridport, 30 June 1999

References

 The Complete Peerage, Volume XIV
 Burke's Peerage
 "Alexander Nelson Hood, 4th Viscount Bridport of Cricket St. Thomas" at The Peerage

External links
www.bridport.ch Profile and picture

1948 births
Living people
People educated at Eton College
University of Paris alumni
Viscounts in the Peerage of the United Kingdom
Alexander
British expatriates in France
British expatriates in Switzerland
Bridport